Lists of painters cover painters and are organized by name, nationality, gender, location, school and collection.

General

 List of painters by name
 Lists of painters by nationality
 Women Painters of the World, 1905 book

By location

 List of African-American visual artists
 List of Early Netherlandish painters
 English female artists
 List of Greek vase painters
 List of artists who painted Hawaii and its people
 List of Maine painters
 List of Milanese painters
 List of Russian landscape painters
 List of painters and architects of Venice
 List of painters of Saint Petersburg Union of Artists

By school

 List of Académie des Beaux-Arts members: Painting
 List of Nihonga painters
 List of Yōga painters
 List of Hudson River School artists
 List of Mannerist painters
 List of Carlo Maratta pupils and assistants
 Old Master
 List of Rembrandt pupils

By collection

 Catalog of paintings in the Louvre Museum
 Catalogue of paintings in the National Gallery, London
 List of painters in the Art Institute of Chicago
 List of painters in the Frans Hals Museum
 List of painters in the Los Angeles County Museum of Art
 List of painters in the National Gallery of Art
 List of painters in the Pinakothek
 List of painters in the Rijksmuseum
 List of artists in the Web Gallery of Art (A–K)
 List of artists in the Web Gallery of Art (L-Z)
 Musée d'Orsay